Sandi Arčon (born 6 January 1991) is a Slovenian footballer who plays for Gemonese 1919.

References

External links
PrvaLiga profile 

1991 births
Living people
People from Šempeter pri Gorici
Slovenian footballers
Association football forwards
ND Gorica players
NK Brda players
F.C. Ashdod players
FC Koper players
Górnik Zabrze players
Slovenian PrvaLiga players
Israeli Premier League players
I liga players
Slovenian expatriate footballers
Slovenian expatriate sportspeople in Israel
Expatriate footballers in Israel
Slovenian expatriate sportspeople in Poland
Expatriate footballers in Poland
Slovenian expatriate sportspeople in Italy
Expatriate footballers in Italy
Slovenia youth international footballers
Slovenia under-21 international footballers